Katrín Lea Elenudóttir (born Ekaterina Skorobogatova, ; 22 February 1999) is an Icelandic model and beauty pageant titleholder who was crowned Miss Universe Iceland 2018. She represented Iceland at Miss Universe 2018 pageant in Bangkok, Thailand.

Early life 
Katrín was born on 22 February 1999 in Omsk, Russia to a Russian mother Elena Skorobogatova. She is of mixed German, Ukrainian, Armenian, and Russian descent. When she was nine years old, Katrín emigrated from Russia to Iceland after her mother married an Icelandic man, settling in Reykjavík. After arriving in Iceland, she received Icelandic citizenship and learned to speak Icelandic; she is additionally fluent in English and Russian. Katrín attended Menntaskólinn í Reykjavík, the most prestigious high school in Iceland.

Pageantry
Katrín began her pageantry career at Miss Universe Iceland 2018, competing as Miss Midnight Sun. She went on to win the competition, held in Reykjanesbær, being crowned by outgoing titleholder Arna Ýr Jónsdóttir. 

As Miss Universe Iceland 2018, Katrín represented Iceland at Miss Universe 2018 in Bangkok.

References

External links

1999 births
Living people

Katrin Lea Elenudottir
Katrin Lea Elenudottir
Katrin Lea Elenudottir
Katrin Lea Elenudottir
Katrin Lea Elenudottir
Katrin Lea Elenudottir
Miss Universe 2018 contestants
Katrin Lea Elenudottir
Katrin Lea Elenudottir
Female models from Omsk
Katrin Lea Elenudottir
Katrin Lea Elenudottir